The  was a railway line of West Japan Railway Company (JR West) within Izumo, Shimane, Japan. The line closed on April 1, 1990.

History
The line was opened by the Japanese Government Railways in 1912. Freight services ceased in 1974, and the line was closed in 1990.

The former Taisha Station has been preserved and now serves as a museum. It was certified as an Important Cultural Property in 2004. It is the only remaining station of the former JR Taisha Line, the other two having been demolished and built over since the closure of the line.

Stations

See also
 Izumo Taisha-mae Station
 List of railway lines in Japan

References
This article incorporates material from the corresponding article in the Japanese Wikipedia

Rail transport in Shimane Prefecture
Lines of West Japan Railway Company
Defunct railroads
Railway lines closed in 1990